The data link connector (DLC) is the multi-pin diagnostic connection port for automobiles, trucks, and motorcycles used to interface a scan tool with the control modules of a given vehicle and access on-board diagnostics and live data streams.

Prior to 1996, many OBD-I data link connector's were in the engine compartment, usually near the fuse block.  Also, prior to 1996, there was no standardization for these connectors, and each manufacturer had its own shape with a unique pin arrangement. After 1996, many manufacturers retained their proprietary connectors in addition to the OBD-II interface, because OBD-II ports are only required to transmit emission-related codes and data.

J1708 is a DLC used on heavy duty vehicles.

OBD-II diagnostic connector

The OBD-II DLC (post-1996 vehicles) is usually located under the instrument panel on the driver side, though there are several exceptions. The SAE J1962 specification provides for two standardized hardware interfaces, called type A and type B. Both are female, 16-pin (2x8), D-shaped connectors, and both have a groove between the two rows of pins. But type B has the groove interrupted in the middle, so it isn't possible to plug a type A male connector into a type B socket. It is possible, however, to mate a type B male plug in a type A female socket.

The type A connector is used for vehicles that use 12V supply voltage, whereas type B is used for 24V vehicles and it is required to mark the front of the D-shaped area in blue color.

The OBD-II connector is required to be within  of the steering wheel or somewhere within reach of the driver.

See also
 On-board diagnostics
 OBD-II PIDs – list of data readable with a scan tool
 ELM327 – common integrated circuit inside scan tools
 OBDuino – onboard computer made with Arduino that has the scan tool functions

References 

Automotive electronics